Garage Days is a 2002 Australian comedy-drama film directed by Alex Proyas and written by Proyas, Dave Warner and Michael Udesky. Garage Days is the story of a young Sydney garage band desperately trying to make it big in the competitive world of rock music. Its soundtrack includes the song "Garage Days" featuring Katie Noonan, David McCormack and Andrew Lancaster.

Cast
 Kick Gurry as Freddy
 Maya Stange as Kate
 Pia Miranda as Tanya
 Russell Dykstra as Bruno
 Brett Stiller as Joe
 Chris Sadrinna as Lucy
 Andy Anderson as Kevin
 Marton Csokas as Shad Kern
 Yvette Duncan as Angie
 Tiriel Mora as Thommo
 Holly Brisley as Scarlet
 Matthew Le Nevez as Toby
 Angela Keep as Shad's Assistant

Reception
The film received mixed reviews. Based on reviews from 52 critics collected by the film review aggregator Rotten Tomatoes, 44% gave Garage Days a positive review. At Metacritic, which assigns a weighted average score out of 100 to reviews from mainstream critics, the film received an average score of 50 based on 19 reviews.

See also
 Cinema of Australia
 Rock music in Australia

References

External links
 
Garage Days at Oz Movies
 
 Garage Days at the National Film and Sound Archive

2002 films
Australian rock music films
Australian comedy films
Films directed by Alex Proyas
Films produced by Alex Proyas
Films shot in Sydney
Films set in Sydney
Films with screenplays by Alex Proyas
Fox Searchlight Pictures films
2002 comedy films
2000s English-language films